Miguel Ángel Cuesta (born 16 March 1991), known professionally as Miguel Cuesta, is a Spanish pop-rock singer. In early 2014 he published his first studio album, Quality Pop.
Miguel Cuesta is interested in music since childhood, at age 12, when he composed his first songs.

Discography

Albums 
Quality Pop (2014)

Singles 
Qué Más Da (2012)
Everybody Is Jumping (2014)

Videoclips 
Everybody Is Jumping (2014)
No Aprenderé (ft. Miriam Rupy) (2014)
Siempre (2015)

References

External links 
 miguelcuesta.es
 Miguel Cuesta's account on Twitter

1991 births
Spanish pop singers
Living people
21st-century Spanish singers
21st-century Spanish male singers